Kellen Vincent Clemens (born June 7, 1983) is a former American football quarterback who spent eleven seasons in the National Football League (NFL). He was selected by the New York Jets in the second round of the 2006 NFL Draft. He played college football at Oregon.

He has also been a member of the Washington Redskins, Houston Texans, St. Louis Rams, and San Diego / Los Angeles Chargers.

Early years
Born and raised in Burns in eastern Oregon, Clemens played high school football for the Burns Hilanders and led them to the Oregon state 3A championship game in 1999. In his high school career, he threw for a state-record 8,646 yards (610-of-1,112) and 102 touchdowns. He was coached by Terry Graham using the run and shoot offense.

College career
Clemens played college football at the University of Oregon in Eugene. He played for head coach Mike Bellotti while at Oregon. He assumed the role of starting quarterback in all 13 games in 2003 and responded by throwing for more touchdown passes and yards than any sophomore in school history, surpassing Dan Fouts—who had 16 touchdowns and 2,390 yards, in 1970. Clemens posted three rushing touchdowns, three passing touchdowns and a career-best 437 passing yards in a road victory over Washington State as a junior. As a senior in 2005, he broke his ankle while playing against Arizona. Despite missing remaining three games of the season, Clemens finished 2005 with 2,406 passing yards, 19 touchdowns, four interceptions, and a 152.87 passer efficiency rating. He finished his Oregon career with 7,555 passing yards, which ranked third in school history at the time before being passed up by Marcus Mariota in the 2014 season.

Statistics

Professional career

New York Jets

Clemens was selected by the New York Jets in the second round of the 2006 NFL Draft, the 49th overall pick, to serve as the secondary quarterback to Chad Pennington. A healthy Pennington resulted in little playing time for Clemens in 2006. He made his NFL debut in relief appearance against the Jacksonville Jaguars, recording his first career pass attempt and rushing once for two yards in the 41–0 loss. He entered in a Week 14 31–13 loss to the Buffalo Bills, rushed once for eight yards but did not attempt a pass. He recorded only two attempts and 0 completions in his rookie season.

Due to an injury to Pennington in the Jets's 2007 season opener against the New England Patriots, Clemens recorded his first completed pass in the NFL with a final record for the day of five complete passes on ten attempts in the 38–14 loss. Clemens made his first career start in Week 2 of the 2007 season. His effectiveness was minimized by the Ravens's defense for the first three quarters, with the Jets trailing 20–3 at one point. However, in the fourth quarter, Clemens led the Jets on a scoring drive that cut Baltimore's lead to 20–13. On the last drive, he attempted what would have been a game-tying touchdown pass to Jets wide receiver Justin McCareins, but the pass was dropped by McCareins and intercepted by the Ravens' Ray Lewis.

His next appearance came in week 8 against the Buffalo Bills. A struggling Pennington was pulled by head coach Eric Mangini in the middle of the fourth quarter and replaced by Clemens. Clemens led two drives against the Buffalo defense. Down 13–3 and pressed for time, Clemens attempted to quickly move the Jets offense down the field but was intercepted twice. The following day, on October 29, 2007, Clemens was named the starting quarterback for the next game against the Washington Redskins. In the 23–20 loss, he had 226 passing yards and a passing touchdown. He finished the 2007 season with 1,529 passing yards, five passing touchdowns, and ten interceptions in 11 games.

In 2008, Clemens was only on the field in two games to attempt five passes as the backup to Brett Favre. When Mike Nugent, the Jets's kicker, injured his thigh in the September 7 game against the Miami Dolphins, Clemens filled in as the team's placekicker, but was not called upon to kick.

On August 26, 2009, Jet's head coach Rex Ryan announced that Mark Sanchez would be the starting quarterback for the 2009 season, a position left vacant after Brett Favre was released from the Jets in February.  On December 3, Clemens was forced to come in against the Buffalo Bills after Mark Sanchez sprained his PCL. Clemens started the Jets's next game against the 1-11 Tampa Bay Buccaneers. Despite an unexceptional personal performance by Clemens, the Jets were still able to pick up an important 26–3 victory.

Clemens threw for 125 yards with no touchdowns in 2009 and played mostly when Mark Sanchez was injured. He was re-signed to a one-year contract for the 2010 season on April 13, but the only action he saw was in the Week 17 game against the Buffalo Bills.

Washington Redskins
On July 27, 2011, Clemens signed a one-year contract with the Washington Redskins where he competed for a backup role during the 2011 preseason. He was released by the team on September 3.

Houston Texans

Clemens was signed by the Houston Texans on November 23, 2011, after starting quarterback Matt Schaub was placed on injured reserve. Two weeks later, he was waived in order for the Texans to sign Jeff Garcia.

St. Louis Rams
The St. Louis Rams claimed Clemens off of waivers from Houston on December 7. 2011.

After an ankle sprain sidelined starting quarterback Sam Bradford and with backup A. J. Feeley out with a thumb injury, Clemens started on December 18 against the Cincinnati Bengals. With only 11 days to get familiar with the team and the offense, Clemens passed for 229 yards completing 25-of-36 passes. In that game, he completed a 25-yard touchdown pass to wide receiver Danario Alexander, his first NFL touchdown pass since Week 17 of the 2007 season with the Jets, but the Bengals won by a score of 20–13. Clemens started the final two games for the Rams, both losses to the Steelers and rival 49ers. He finished the 2011 season with two touchdown passes and one rushing touchdown, and was re-signed by the Rams.

In the 2012 season, Clemens only saw action in two games against the New England Patriots and Arizona Cardinals. He completed one pass for 39 yards and had two rushes for five yards.

After Bradford went down with a season-ending injury in Week 7 in 2013, Clemens started the final nine games, going 4-5 as the Rams' starter and finished with 1,673 yards, eight touchdowns, and seven interceptions.

San Diego / Los Angeles Chargers

Clemens signed a two-year contract with the San Diego Chargers on March 13, 2014. In the 2014 season, he only appeared in two games and completed one pass for 10 yards. Clemens threw his first touchdown as a Charger on September 27, 2015, a 19-yard pass to Keenan Allen against the Minnesota Vikings.

In the 2016 season, Clemens appeared in one game, a 38–7 victory over the Jacksonville Jaguars, in relief of Philip Rivers at quarterback. In addition, he saw some playing time on special teams throughout the season.

Clemens was re-signed to a one-year contract on March 9, 2017. On September 2, 2017, he was released by the Chargers, but was re-signed two days later. In the 2017 season, he remained in a relief role and completed six passes for 75 yards and an interception.

NFL career statistics

Personal life
Clemens grew up herding cattle in eastern Oregon on his family's  ranch in Burns, where they own over 100 head of cattle.As a young boy, Kellen enjoyed horseback riding in his spare time. 

Clemens is an active and practicing Roman Catholic, and is married with four children with a strong religious devotion to the Holy Family of Nazareth. In a February 2012 interview with the National Catholic Register, he noted that his patron saint is Jesus Christ and has special religious devotion to Our Lady of Mount Carmel. He also noted that he wears the Brown Scapular in connection to this religious faith. Furthermore, Clemens claimed, "You have to vote for the candidate who is most pro-life," and said he voted for Mitt Romney in 2012.

Clemens has four younger sisters. He majored in Business Administration at the University of Oregon. Earning International League All Star recognition in 1998 Clemens is an active member of Catholic Athletes for Christ. He and his wife Nicole currently reside in Walla Walla, Washington. Clemens also expressed a feeling of deep honour when Pope Benedict XVI blessed and kissed their four-week-old baby girl at the final procession of the Papal Mass on April 17, 2008, at Nationals Park in Washington D.C.  Clemens, in appreciation for the blessing, gave Pope Benedict his autograph by signing his mitre.

References

External links

Oregon Ducks bio

1983 births
Living people
Ranchers from Oregon
People from Burns, Oregon
People from Hanover Township, New Jersey
Players of American football from Oregon
American football quarterbacks
Oregon Ducks football players
New York Jets players
Washington Redskins players
Houston Texans players
St. Louis Rams players
San Diego Chargers players
Los Angeles Chargers players
Players of American football from New Jersey
Sportspeople from Morris County, New Jersey
Catholics from New Jersey
Catholics from Oregon